= Golden Dragon Cannon =

- Chinese: 金龙炮
- Invented: 1680
- Used by: The Emperor of Qing Dynasty when he led his own troops into battles

The Golden Dragon Cannon (simplified Chinese: 金龙炮; traditional Chinese: 金龍炮) was a type of cannon with a short barrel, made of bronze or iron, used exclusively by the Emperor of Qing Dynasty when he led his own troops into battles (御驾亲征).

== History ==
In the 19th year of Kangxi (1680), the Golden Dragon Cannon made of bronze was produced.

In the 25th year of Kangxi (1686), the Golden Dragon Cannon made of iron was manufactured.
